Survey of Ophthalmology is a review journal dedicated to publishing reviews of ophthalmological topics by established authorities in that particular field. It is a strictly refereed journal with a bi-monthly publication schedule. The procedure of evaluating and inviting specific topics is done primarily by selecting current academics with a record of innovative and original research, supported by publications in international peer journals.

See also
Archives of Ophthalmology
Investigative Ophthalmology & Visual Science
List of medical journals

External links

Ophthalmology journals
Elsevier academic journals
Review journals
Bimonthly journals
English-language journals
Publications established in 1956